Ersi (also Romanized as Ersī) is a village in Ersi Rural District, in the Central District of Jolfa County, East Azerbaijan Province, Iran. At the 2006 census, its population was 879, in 271 families.

References 

Populated places in Jolfa County